Frankisch can refer to:
 Gewürztraminer, a wine grape
 Franconian languages spoken by the Franks